Dr. Karen Kelsall (born December 11, 1962) is a Canadian chiropractor and a retired gymnast and dancer. She was the youngest competitor at the 1976 Summer Olympics in Montreal, and was one of the first Canadian gymnasts to attract attention from the international gymnastics community.

Although she was born in Canada, Kelsall spent a fair amount of her gymnastics career training in the United States. She trained in Oregon under coaches Dick and Linda Mulvihill, who at the time were perfecting a form of gymnastics training that incorporated video recordings and mechanical spotting equipment. She was the junior Canadian national champion in 1976, the senior National Champion in 1977 and 1980, and the British Columbian champion in 1977. She represented Canada at various international competitions from 1975 through 1980, including the 1975 Pan Am Games, where she placed thirteenth in the all-around; the 1977 American Cup, where she was the all-around bronze medalist; the 1978 World Championships and the 1978 Commonwealth Games, where she was a member of the gold medal-winning Canadian team and tied for the bronze medal in the all-around.

In 1976, the thirteen-year-old Kelsall placed third at the Canadian Olympic Trials. FIG regulations at the time required gymnasts to be fourteen years old by the start of the Olympics. The Canadian Gymnastics Federation applied for, and received, a special exception for Kelsall to compete, because she would turn fourteen by the end of the year. At the Olympics, Kelsall placed a modest 27th in the all-around, but was a key member of the ninth-place Canadian team.

Canada participated in the Olympic boycott of 1980, and as such, Kelsall did not have the opportunity to attend a second Olympic Games. She moved on to college, where she competed as an NCAA gymnast for the University of California, Berkeley for four years.

After her undergraduate work and a brief career as a professional dancer, Kelsall returned to university. She is currently a chiropractor in the Pacific Northwest, with additional certification in massage therapy and other modalities.

Kelsall originated an element on balance beam, the Kelsall Stretch. The skill is a flexibility move that is performed on the beam by standing on one foot while performing a split and grabbing the other leg from behind.

Kelsall was featured in the book "The Making of a Gymnast: The Karen Kelsall Story" (1978) authored by Jean Boulogne.

References
Kelsall biography at Gymnastics Canada
About Dr. Kelsall from her website

1962 births
Living people
Canadian female artistic gymnasts
Olympic gymnasts of Canada
Gymnasts at the 1976 Summer Olympics
Originators of elements in artistic gymnastics
Gymnasts at the 1978 Commonwealth Games
Sportspeople from Nanaimo
Commonwealth Games medallists in gymnastics
Commonwealth Games gold medallists for Canada
Medallists at the 1978 Commonwealth Games